Dan William Rogas Sr. was a professional American football player who played offensive lineman for two seasons for the Detroit Lions and Philadelphia Eagles.

References

1926 births
American football offensive linemen
Philadelphia Eagles players
Detroit Lions players
Tulane Green Wave football players
2018 deaths